Murilo Otávio Mendes (born 8 March 1995), known simply as Murilo, is a Brazilian footballer who plays as a forward for Italian  club Virtus Francavilla.

Club career
On 8 January 2021, he signed a 3.5-year contract with Viterbese.

On 15 July 2022, Murilo moved to Virtus Francavilla.

References

External links

1995 births
Living people
Footballers from Belo Horizonte
Brazilian footballers
Association football forwards
Primeira Liga players
Liga Portugal 2 players
S.C. Olhanense players
Serie C players
Serie B players
U.S. Livorno 1915 players
U.S. Viterbese 1908 players
Virtus Francavilla Calcio players
Brazilian expatriate footballers
Expatriate footballers in Portugal
Expatriate footballers in Italy
Brazilian expatriate sportspeople in Portugal
Brazilian expatriate sportspeople in Italy